Lee McGregor (born 24 December 1996) is a Scottish professional boxer. At regional level, he held the Commonwealth bantamweight title from 2018 to 2023, the British bantamweight title from 2019 to 2023, and the European bantamweight title from 2021 to 2023.

Professional career 

McGregor made his professional debut on 11 November 2017, scoring a first-round technical knockout (TKO) victory against Stefan Sashev at the Royal Highland Centre in Edinburgh.

After compiling a record of 3–0 (3 KOs), he defeated Goodluck Mrema via second-round TKO to capture the vacant IBF Youth bantamweight title on 23 June 2018, at the SSE Hydro in Glasgow.

His next fight came against former Commonwealth flyweight champion Thomas Essomba on 13 October at the York Hall in London, with the vacant Commonwealth bantamweight title on the line. McGregor captured the title via twelfth-round knockout (KO) victory in only his fifth professional bout. Following a points decision (PTS) victory against Brett Fidoe in a non-title fight in May 2019, Mcgregor made the first defence of his Commonwealth title, defeating Scott Allan via eighth-round TKO on 22 June at the Emirates Arena in Glasgow.

McGregor returned to the Emirates Stadium for his next fight, facing British bantamweight champion and fellow Scot, Kash Farooq, on 16 November in a unification fight for the British and Commonwealth titles. In what was described by media outlets as a "controversial decision", McGregor emerged victorious via twelve-round split decision (SD) with two judges scoring the bout 115–112 and 114–113 in favour of McGregor, while the third judge scored it 114–113 to Farooq.

Following a TKO victory against Ryan Walker in a non-title fight in August 2020, McGregor sought to add another title to his collection by challenging reigning champion Karim Guerfi for the European bantamweight title on 19 March 2021, at the Whites Hotel in Bolton, England. McGregor knocked his opponent to the canvas three times in the first round. Guerfi made it back to his feet on all three occasions, however, the referee called a halt to the contest after the third knockdown at 2:43 of the round.

McGregor made his first EBU bantamweight title defense against Vincent Legrand on 6 August 2021, at the Falls Park in Belfast, Northern Ireland, on the undercard of the WBA interim featherweight title clash between Michael Conlan and T. J. Doheny. McGregor had a poor start to the fight, as he was knocked down in the second round, but successfully rallied back to knock Legrand out in the fourth round.

Professional boxing record

References

External links

Living people
1996 births
Boxers from Edinburgh
Scottish male boxers
Bantamweight boxers
Commonwealth Boxing Council champions
British Boxing Board of Control champions